Henri Marès (18 January 1820 – 9 May 1901) was a French agronomist.

1820 births
1901 deaths
École Centrale Paris alumni
French agronomists
French viticulturists
People from Chalon-sur-Saône